Struma may refer to:

 Struma (medicine), a swelling in the neck due to an enlarged thyroid gland
 Struma (skin disease), a mycobacterial skin disease
 Struma (river), a river in Bulgaria and Greece
 Struma motorway, a Bulgarian motorway
 Struma (village), a village in Bulgaria
 , a ship chartered to carry Jewish refugees from Axis-allied Romania to British-controlled Palestine in World War II sunken in the Struma disaster, the largest civilian Black Sea naval disaster of World War II
 Struma Glacier, a glacier in Antarctica

See also
 Struma Corps, of the Ottoman Empire
 Struma Offensive in the First World War
 Stroma (disambiguation)